John Horton McDermid, PC, FRI (born March 17, 1940) is a former Canadian politician.

McDermid worked in marketing, public relations and broadcasting before entered politics. He was elected to the House of Commons of Canada in the 1979 federal election as the Progressive Conservative Member of Parliament for Brampton—Georgetown outside of Toronto, Ontario.

He was re-elected in the 1980, 1984 and 1988 elections. He became a parliamentary secretary when the Tories took power in 1984. From 1988 to 1993, he served in the Cabinet of Prime Minister Brian Mulroney as series of junior minister positions: Minister of State for Housing (1988-1989), International Trade (1988-1989), Privatization and Regulatory Affairs (1989-1991), and Finance and Privatization (1991-1993).

He left Cabinet with the departure of Mulroney as Prime Minister of Canada in June 1993, and did not run in the 1993 federal election.

Electoral record

|}

|}

|}

References

External links
 John McDermid fonds at the Region of Peel Archives, Peel Art Gallery, Museum and Archives

Living people
1940 births
Politicians from Brampton
Members of the House of Commons of Canada from Ontario
Members of the King's Privy Council for Canada
Members of the United Church of Canada
Progressive Conservative Party of Canada MPs
Members of the 24th Canadian Ministry